The 1944 Massachusetts gubernatorial election was held on November 7, 1944. Democrat Maurice J. Tobin defeated Republican Horace T. Cahill, Socialist Labor candidate Henning A. Blomen, and Prohibition candidate Guy S. Williams.  Incumbent governor Leverett Saltonstall did not run for reelection. In the race for lieutenant governor, Republican Robert F. Bradford defeated Democrat John B. Carr, Socialist Labor candidate George L. McGlynn, and Prohibition candidate Alfred Erickson.

Primaries

Governor
Horace T. Cahill ran unopposed in the Republican primary. Boston mayor Maurice J. Tobin defeated state treasurer Francis X. Hurley for the Democratic nomination for Governor.

Lt. Governor
Middlesex County District Attorney Robert F. Bradford defeated Senate President Jarvis Hunt, Speaker of the House Rudolph King, Beverly mayor Daniel E. McLean, and perennial candidate William McMasters for the Republican nomination.

Somerville assessor John B. Carr defeated former Worcester mayor John S. Sullivan, former state representative Alexander F. Sullivan, and Everett city councilor Alfred P. Farese for the Democratic nomination.

General election

Governor

See also
 1943–1944 Massachusetts legislature

References

Governor
1944
Massachusetts governor
November 1944 events